Damesvolleybalclub Tongeren is a Belgian women's volleyball team based in Tongeren. 

The club was founded in 1967, under the name Tovoc. After a merger with Hasselt, the club's name changed to Hatovoc. This team promoted for the first time to Ere Divisie Dames in 1985. The merger with Hasselt ended in 1990, and the name was again changed: Datovoc. Datovoc Tongeren has been present at the highest level of the Belgian volleyball league pyramid since 1985, no other team does better. 

After several national titles and cup wins, and to avoid financial trouble, Datovoc has changed their strategy and now mainly focusses on young, talented Belgian players. This strategy is followed by most of the teams present in Ere Divisie.

Honours

National competitions
  Belgian Championship: 7
1993–94, 1994–95, 2001–02, 2002–03, 2003–04, 2004–05, 2006–07

  Belgian Cup: 6
1991–92, 1993–94, 1999–00, 2002–03, 2003–04, 2004–05

  Belgian Supercup: 1
2008

International competitions
Top Teams Cup:
Third (2): 2003–04, 2004–05
Fourth (2): 2001–02, 2005–06

Current squad
Coach:  Hans Bungeneers

External links
Official site 

 

Belgian volleyball clubs
Sport in Tongeren